Kotri Bridge is a road-rail bridge situated between Kotri and Hyderabad on Indus river in Sindh, Pakistan.

History
It was opened to traffic on 25 May 1900 and was reconstructed in 1931.

It has single railway track and roads on either side of railway track. In the early 1980s another railway bridge was constructed for railway traffic side by side to old bridge. It is known as Mehran Railway Bridge. Kotri Bridge is still in use for one way railway and two way road traffic.

See also 
 Kotri Barrage (some miles upstream)
 Kotri Junction Railway Station

References 

Bridges in Sindh
Road-rail bridges in Pakistan
Bridges over the Indus River
1900s establishments in British India